Alternanthera dentata, known as little ruby and ruby leaf alternanthera, is a fast-growing ornamental groundcover plant in the amaranth family which was first described by Conrad Moench, and got its current name from Stuchlík and Robert Elias Fries. Native to the West Indies and Brazil, the plant is chiefly grown for its coloured foliage. It is one of the dozen synonyms of Alternanthera brasiliana, (please correct: A. dentata Scheygr., not A. dentata Stuchlík ex R.E.Fr.) and is alike in appearance with Alternanthera bettzickiana, which all have strikingly similar looking cultivars.

Description
Growing 60 to 80 cm, the herbaceous plant features burgundy-coloured, pointed foliage with a radiant ruby red rearwards and it has a compact, mounding and spreading habit. The popular cultivar 'Little Ruby' is shorter and slightly less brownish in colour, in addition to having smaller leaves as well. The plant features dark creamy, pompom-like flowers, which bloom in winter and early spring.

Cultivation
Suited for pots, it may be used as a hedge and as a contrasting plant to the more lighter foliage in the garden. Thriving in humid conditions and has heat tolerance, the plant does best in well drained soil under a full sun to partial shade, with somewhat shaded frost-free location in the garden. The plant can easily be propagated by stem cuttings and would root readily in plain water.

Gallery

References

External links

Alternanthera Dentata by Burke's Backyard

dentata
Ornamental plants
Garden plants
Flora of Brazil
Flora of the Caribbean
Flora without expected TNC conservation status